Malta has entered the Junior Eurovision Song Contest eighteen times since debuting at the first contest in 2003. Maltese broadcaster PBS has been responsible for the country's participation, and organises a televised national final to select the country's entrant. Malta did not participate in 2011 and 2012, and selected the entrant internally instead of using a national final in 2013 and 2014.

Malta has won the contest twice: in  when Gaia Cauchi won with the song "The Start", and again in  when Destiny Chukunyere won with "Not My Soul" with 185 points.

History 

On 16 July 2011, PBS announced its withdrawal from the ninth edition of the Junior Eurovision Song Contest; the first time Malta was absent. In 2013, PBS opted for an internal selection since the broadcaster decided to return to the contest at a rather late stage (25 September 2013). PBS chose Gaia Cauchi as the 2013 Maltese representative.

Because Malta has multiple official languages, entrants can sing in Maltese and English.

Participation overview

Photogallery

Awards

Winners of the press vote

Commentators and spokespersons

Hostings

See also
Malta in the Eurovision Song Contest – Senior version of the Junior Eurovision Song Contest.
Malta in the Eurovision Young Dancers – A competition organised by the EBU for younger dancers aged between 16 and 21.
Malta in the Eurovision Young Musicians – A competition organised by the EBU for musicians aged 18 years and younger.

References 

 
Malta
Junior Eurovision Song Contest